Koba Guliashvili (born 13 April 1968) is a Georgian wrestler. He competed at the 1996 Summer Olympics and the 2000 Summer Olympics.

References

1968 births
Living people
Male sport wrestlers from Georgia (country)
Olympic wrestlers of Georgia (country)
Wrestlers at the 1996 Summer Olympics
Wrestlers at the 2000 Summer Olympics
People from Kvemo Kartli